This is a list of seasons played by Kilmarnock Football Club, an association football club based in Kilmarnock in East Ayrshire, Scotland, up to the present day. The list details the club's record in major league and cup competitions. Records of regular minor competitions, such as the Ayrshire Cup which Kilmarnock won 43 times, are not included.

Summary

Kilmarnock F.C. was founded in 1869 during a general meeting at Robertson's Temperance Hotel on Portland Street. The club first played professional football in 1873 when they participated in the inaugural season of the Scottish Cup, an annual knockout competition. They did not play league fixtures until 1895 when they joined the Scottish Football League, competing in the 1895–96 Scottish Division Two.

Having won the Scottish Cup twice (1920 and 1929) from five appearances in the final before the Second World War, the club's finest achievement was winning the Scottish league title in 1964–65, securing the championship on goal average on the final day by beating direct challengers Hearts 2–0 away from home. It ended a long wait for a trophy – they had been runners-up in four of the past five seasons, and had lost in major domestic cup finals four times in the previous seven years. In the 1966–67 season, Kilmarnock reached the semi-finals of the Inter-Cities Fairs Cup, but this was to mark the end of their spell of high achievement, and by 1972–73 they had been relegated for only the second time in their history.

They spent the next two decades regularly swapping between the first and second levels (and one season in the third) before going up to the top tier in 1992–93; they have remained there since, with only three other clubs having longer current runs at that level. Killie won the Scottish Cup for a third time in 1997, and finally claimed the Scottish League Cup, in their sixth appearance in the final, in 2012. In 2018–19, the club's 150th anniversary season, they finished in 3rd place in the Scottish Premiership, their highest position and points total in the modern era.

On 24 May 2021 Kilmarnock were relegated to the Scottish Championship. This is the first time in 28 years they will have played out of the top flight.

Seasons

Pre-1891
Between the club's formation in 1869 and 1891 – when they joined the Scottish Football Alliance – Kilmarnock only competed in cup competitions including the Scottish Cup and the Ayrshire Cup.

Notes

1891–1914

Notes

1914–1919
During World War I a number of changes were introduced, the Scottish Cup was suspended for the duration of the conflict and a number of teams were weakened as players went off to fight in the war. Kilmarnock continued to compete in the Scottish Football League.

1919–1939

1939–1946
Kilmarnock were inactive during World War II as their Rugby Park ground was used as a munitions store by the British Army during the conflict. They began the 1939–40 season in the subsequently abandoned SFL Division One before competing in the unofficial Emergency League West, finishing eighth, and the Scottish War Emergency Cup where they reached the quarter-finals. The club began competing after the conflict had ended in 1945–46, again in unofficial competitions. They finished 15th in the Southern League, were eliminated in the group stages of the Southern League Cup and lost in the second round of the Victory Cup.

1946–present

Notes

League performance summary 
The Scottish Football League was founded in 1890 and, other than during seven years of hiatus during World War II, the national top division has been played every season since. The following is a summary of Kilmarnock's divisional status:

125 total eligible seasons (including 2019–20)
93 seasons in top level
26 seasons in second level
1 season in third level
0 seasons in fourth level
5 seasons not involved – before club was league member

References

External links
Football Club History Database
Soccerbase
FitbaStats

Seasons
 
Kilmarnock